The Samsung Galaxy Core LTE is an Android smartphone designed, developed, and marketed by Samsung Electronics. Announced at the 2014 Mobile World Congress in Barcelona, Spain, the Galaxy Core LTE features a  diagonal qHD display, 4G LTE connectivity and Android Jelly Bean 4.2.

References

Android (operating system) devices
Samsung mobile phones
Samsung Galaxy
Mobile phones introduced in 2014